Push! Push! is a 1997 South Korean black comedy film directed by Park Chul-soo about the experiences of two female doctors in an obstetrics and gynecology clinic.

Plot
There are two female doctors in an obstetrics and gynecology clinic. Jung-yeon is fed up with delivering and aborting babies all day long. Hae-seok treats various gynecological diseases. They are very close friends.

Jung-yeon, who is married, puts more emphasis on being a rational woman than being a mother. On the other hand, the single Hae-seok thinks the opposite. With their own two distinct styles, they handle various cases at the clinic. One day, an unbelievable situation happens when the two doctors, a woman, her husband, and her mother-in-law all become excited about the successful birth of test-tube twins...

Cast
Hwang Shin-hye
Bang Eun-jin
Shin Shin-ae as Park Shin-ae, head nurse
Seo Kap-sook
Hong Yun-jeong
Jo Sang-gun
Chung Jin-gak
Yoo Myeong-sun
Moon Mi-bong
Lim Yae-sim

References

External links
 
 

1997 films
1997 comedy films
1990s black comedy films
1990s pregnancy films
South Korean black comedy films
Films directed by Park Chul-soo
CJ Entertainment films
Medical-themed films